"Happy" is a song by American singer Ashanti from her self-titled debut album (2002). The track was written by Ashanti, Chink Santana, and Irv Gotti, with production overseen by Santana and Gotti, and contains a sample of Gap Band's "Outstanding" (1982), written by Raymond Calhoun. "Happy" was released as the album's second single on June 17, 2002, reaching number eight on the US Billboard Hot 100 and number six on the Billboard Hot R&B/Hip-Hop Songs chart. Elsewhere, the single entered the top 10 in the Netherlands while reaching the top 20 in Ireland, New Zealand, and the United Kingdom.

Remix
The remix of "Happy", titled "I'm So Happy", was produced by Santana and features rapper Charli Baltimore and further integrates a sample of "Outstanding". This version was later included on the Murder Inc. remix-compilation Irv Gotti Presents: The Remixes.

Track listings

UK CD single
 "Happy" (radio edit featuring Ja Rule) – 3:59
 "I'm So Happy" (remix featuring Charli Baltimore) – 3:58
 "Happy" (explicit remix featuring Ja Rule) – 3:59
 "Happy" (DnD vocal mix featuring Ja Rule) – 4:51
 "Happy" (video featuring Ja Rule) – 4:00

UK cassette single
 "Happy" (radio edit featuring Ja Rule) – 3:59
 "I'm So Happy" (remix featuring Charli Baltimore) – 3:58

European CD single
 "Happy" (album version)
 "Call" (album version)

Australian CD single
 "Happy" (album version)
 "Call" (album version)
 "I'm So Happy" (remix featuring Charli Baltimore)
 "Happy" (video)

Credits and personnel
Credits are adapted from the UK CD single liner notes.

Studios
 Recorded at Crackhouse Studios (New York City)
 Mixed at Sound Castle Studios (Los Angeles)
 Mastered at Sony Music Studios (London, England)

Personnel

 Raymond Calhoun – writing ("Outstanding")
 Ashanti Douglas – writing, vocals
 Chink Santana – writing (as Andre Parker), all instruments, production
 Irv Gotti – writing (as Irv Lorenzo), production, mixing, video director
 Ja Rule – featured vocals

 Darwin Johnson – bass guitar
 Milwaukee Buck – recording
 Charles "Chee" Heath – assistant recording engineer
 Brian Springer – mixing
 Naweed "Dirty" Ahmed – mastering

Charts

Weekly charts

Year-end charts

Release history

References

2002 singles
2002 songs
Ashanti (singer) songs
Songs written by Ashanti (singer)
Songs written by Chink Santana
Songs written by Irv Gotti